Pascal "Pagge" Simpson (born 4 May 1971) is a Swedish former professional footballer who played as a forward. He represented IF Brommapojkarna, AIK, Vålerenga IF, FC Copenhagen, and Halmstads BK during a career that spanned between 1990 and 2003. He won two caps for the Sweden national team in 1997 and also represented the Sweden Olympic team at the 1992 Summer Olympics.

Early life
Simpson was born in Lomé, Togo, to a Togolese father and a German mother, moved to Sweden at the age of six and was raised on Ekerö, Stockholm. His father had played professional football in Germany. He acquired Swedish citizenship in September 1991.

Club career
Simpson started his football career in Ekerö IK and joined IF Brommapojkarna in 1988. He won the JSM för klubblag with the IF Brommapojkarna youth squad in 1989 and made his senior debut in 1990.

He joined AIK and was part of the AIK squad that won the Swedish Championship in 1992, its first such championship in 55 years. Simpson contributed significantly to the win. He scored twice against FC Barcelona in the 1997 Cup Winners Cup quarter-finals; at Camp Nou he stunned the Catalans by scoring in the first minute of play. He was also part of the AIK squad that won the Swedish cup in 1996 and 1997. In the 1996 cup final he scored the winning goal against Malmö FF.

Simpson had severe leg and knee problems due to a ligament injury. He had surgery in 1997 but in the end this damage caused his footballing career to come to an early end. The knee injury has caused Simpson severe pain, stopping him from running and jogging. Despite this, he has stayed involved with football by coaching youth for Brommapojkarna and lower league clubs. In 2007, he was the coach for IFK Eskilstuna but left due to the club's financial problems.

International career
Simpson played seven matches for the Swedish Olympic football team in 1991 and 1992. He scored the qualifying goal for the Swedish Olympic football team against the Netherlands that landed the team a spot at the 1992 Olympics in Barcelona.

Simpson made his full international debut for the Sweden national team on 9 February 1997 in a 2–0 friendly win against Romania, playing for 67 minutes alongside Marino Rahmberg at forward before being replaced by Robert Steiner. He won his second and last cap four days later in a friendly 1–0 win against Japan, playing for 76 minutes before being substituted by Daniel Andersson.

Coaching career
Simpson managed Södertälje FK. In December 2015, it was announced that Simpson was taking over Swedish third-tier team Vasalund after Roberth Björknesjö. His first game in charge was a pre-season 5–4 victory over his old club AIK.

Honours
AIK
 Swedish Champion: 1992
 Svenska Cupen: 1995–96, 1996–97

FC Copenhagen
 Danish Superliga: 2000–01, 2002–03

References

1971 births
Living people
Association football forwards
Swedish footballers
Sweden international footballers
Sweden under-21 international footballers
Olympic footballers of Sweden
Footballers at the 1992 Summer Olympics
AIK Fotboll players
F.C. Copenhagen players
Vålerenga Fotball players
Danish Superliga players
Eliteserien players
Swedish expatriate footballers
Expatriate men's footballers in Denmark
Expatriate footballers in Norway
Swedish expatriate sportspeople in Denmark
Swedish expatriate sportspeople in Norway
Swedish people of German descent
Swedish people of Togolese descent
Togolese people of German descent
Togolese emigrants to Sweden
Swedish football managers
IFK Eskilstuna managers
Gröndals IK managers